SIMATIC WinCC is a supervisory control and data acquisition (SCADA) and human-machine interface (HMI) system from Siemens. SCADA systems are used to monitor and control physical processes involved in industry and infrastructure on a large scale and over long distances. SIMATIC WinCC can be used in combination with Siemens controllers. WinCC is written for the Microsoft Windows operating system. It uses Microsoft SQL Server for logging and comes with a VBScript and ANSI C application programming interface.

In 2010, WinCC and PCS 7 were the first known SCADA systems to be specifically targeted by malware. The Stuxnet worm can spy on and even reprogram infected systems.

References

External links 
 Siemens' WinCC product page
 WinCC' WinCC scada page Introduction to WinCC Flexible

Industrial automation software
SCADA
Siemens software products

et:SIMATIC#WinCC